Vladyslav Bobryshev (born September 10, 1997) is a Ukrainian male acrobatic gymnast. Along with his partner, Andrii Kobchyk, he finished 6th in the 2014 Acrobatic Gymnastics World Championships.

References

1997 births
Living people
Ukrainian acrobatic gymnasts
Male acrobatic gymnasts